William Felton "Bill" Russell (February 12, 1934 – July 31, 2022) was an American professional basketball player who played as a center for the Boston Celtics of the National Basketball Association (NBA) from 1956 to 1969. A five-time NBA Most Valuable Player (MVP) and a 12-time NBA All-Star, he was the centerpiece of the Celtics dynasty that won 11 NBA championships during his 13-year career. Russell and Henri Richard of the National Hockey League are tied for the record of the most championships won by an athlete in a North American sports league. Russell is widely considered to be one of the greatest basketball players of all time. He led the San Francisco Dons to two consecutive NCAA championships in 1955 and 1956, and he captained the gold-medal winning U.S. national basketball team at the 1956 Summer Olympics.

Despite his limitations on offense, as Russell averaged 15.1 points per game, his rebounding, defense, and leadership made him one of the dominant players of his era. Russell was equally notable for his rebounding abilities, and he led the NBA in rebounds four times, had a dozen consecutive seasons of 1,000 or more rebounds, and remains second all time in both total rebounds and rebounds per game. He is one of just two NBA players (the other being prominent rival Wilt Chamberlain) to have grabbed more than 50 rebounds in a game.

Russell played in the wake of black pioneers Earl Lloyd, Chuck Cooper, and Sweetwater Clifton, and he was the first black player to achieve superstar status in the NBA. He also served a three-season (1966–1969) stint as player-coach for the Celtics, becoming the first black coach in the NBA and the first to win a championship. In 2011, Barack Obama awarded Russell the Presidential Medal of Freedom for his accomplishments on the court and in the civil rights movement.

Russell was inducted into the Naismith Memorial Basketball Hall of Fame in 1975, was one of the founding inductees into the National Collegiate Basketball Hall of Fame in 2006 and was enshrined in the FIBA Hall of Fame in 2007. He was selected into the NBA 25th Anniversary Team in 1971 and the NBA 35th Anniversary Team in 1980, named as one of the 50 Greatest Players in NBA History in 1996, one of only four players to receive all three honors, and selected into the NBA 75th Anniversary Team in 2021. In 2009, the NBA renamed the NBA Finals MVP Award in his honor. In 2021, he was inducted into the Naismith Memorial Basketball Hall of Fame a second time for his coaching career. Shortly after his death in 2022, the NBA retired Russell's #6 jersey league-wide, making him the only player in NBA history to receive the honor.

Early life

Family
Russell was born on February 12, 1934, to Charles Russell and Katie Russell in West Monroe, Louisiana. Like almost all Southern towns and cities of that time, Monroe was very segregated and the Russells often struggled with racism in their daily lives. Russell's father was once refused service at a gas station until the staff had taken care of all the white customers first. When he attempted to leave and find a different station, the attendant stuck a shotgun in his face and threatened to kill him if he did not stay and wait his turn. In another incident, Russell's mother was walking outside in a fancy dress when a white policeman accosted her. He told her to go home and remove the dress, which he described as "white woman's clothing".

During World War II, the Second Great Migration began, as large numbers of Black people were moving to the West to look for work there. When Russell was eight years old, his father moved the family out of Louisiana and settled in Oakland, California. While there, they fell into poverty and Russell spent his childhood living in a series of public housing projects.

His father was said to be a "stern, hard man" who initially worked in a paper factory as a janitor, which was a typical "Negro Job"—low-paid and not intellectually challenging, as sports journalist John Taylor commented. When World War II broke out, the elder Russell became a truck driver. Russell was closer to his mother Katie than to his father, and he received a major emotional blow when she suddenly died when he was 12 years old. His father gave up his trucking job and became a steelworker in order to be closer to his children. Russell stated that his father became his childhood hero, later followed up by Minneapolis Lakers superstar George Mikan, whom he met when he was in high school. Of Russell the college basketball player, Mikan said: "Let's face it, he's the best ever. He's so good, he scares you."

Initial exposure to basketball
During his early years, Russell struggled to develop his skills as a basketball player. Although Russell was a good runner and jumper and had large hands, he did not understand the game and was cut from the team at Herbert Hoover Junior High School. As a freshman at McClymonds High School in Oakland, Russell was almost cut again; as he saw Russell's raw athletic potential, coach George Powles encouraged him to work on his fundamentals. Since Russell's previous experiences with white authority figures were often negative, warm words from Powles reassured him. He worked hard and used the benefits of a growth spurt to become a decent basketball player. Frank Robinson, a future member of the National Baseball Hall of Fame and Museum, was one of Russell's high school basketball teammates.

Russell soon became noted for his unusual style of defense. He later recalled: "To play good defense ... it was told back then that you had to stay flatfooted at all times to react quickly. When I started to jump to make defensive plays and to block shots, I was initially corrected, but I stuck with it, and it paid off." In an autobiographical account, Russell said that while on a California High School All-Stars tour, he became obsessed with studying and memorizing other players' moves, e.g., footwork such as which foot they moved first on which play, as preparation for defending against them, which included practicing in front of a mirror at night. Russell described himself as an avid reader of Dell Magazines' 1950s sports publications, which he used to scout opponents' moves for the purpose of defending against them.

College career

University of San Francisco
Russell was ignored by college recruiters and received not one offer until recruiter Hal DeJulio from the University of San Francisco (USF) watched him play in a high school game. DeJulio was unimpressed by Russell's meager scoring and "atrocious fundamentals", but he sensed that the young Russell had an extraordinary instinct for the game, especially in the clutch. When DeJulio offered Russell a scholarship, he eagerly accepted. Sports journalist John Taylor described it as a watershed event in Russell's life because he realized that basketball was his chance to escape poverty and racism, and he swore to make the best of it.

At USF, Russell became the new starting center for coach Phil Woolpert of the San Francisco Dons. Woolpert emphasized defense and deliberate half-court play, which favored Russell's exceptional defensive skills. Woolpert's choice of how to deploy his players was unaffected by their skin color. In 1954, he became the first coach of a major college basketball squad to start three African-American players: K. C. Jones, Hal Perry, and Russell. In his USF years, Russell took advantage of his relative lack of bulk to develop a unique defensive style: instead of purely guarding the opposing center, he used his quickness and speed to play help defense against opposing forwards and aggressively challenge their shots.

Combining the stature and shot-blocking skills of a center with the foot speed of a guard, Russell became the centerpiece of a USF team that soon became a force in college basketball. After USF kept Holy Cross Crusaders star Tom Heinsohn scoreless in an entire half, Sports Illustrated wrote: "If [Russell] ever learns to hit the basket, they're going to have to rewrite the rules." The NCAA rewrote rules in response to Russell's dominant play; the lane was widened for his junior year. After he graduated, the NCAA rules committee instituted a second new rule to counter the  play of big men like Russell; basket interference was now prohibited. Russell became one of several big men who have brought about NCAA rule changes. The NCAA had previously prohibited goaltending in response to George Mikan (1945) and later banned the dunk shot due to Lew Alcindor (1967), although the latter rule was later repealed.

The games were often difficult for the USF squad, as Russell and his black teammates became targets of racist jeers, particularly on the road. In one incident, hotels in Oklahoma City refused to admit Russell and his black teammates while they were in town for the 1954 All-College Tournament. In protest, the whole team decided to camp out in a closed college dorm, which was later called an important bonding experience for the group. Decades later, Russell explained that his experiences hardened him against abuse of all kinds, saying: "I never permitted myself to be a victim."

Racism shaped his lifelong paradigm as a team player, about which Russell said: "At that time it was never acceptable that a black player was the best. That did not happen ... My junior year in college, I had what I thought was the one of the best college seasons ever. We won 28 out of 29 games. We won the National Championship. I was the MVP at the Final Four. I was first team All American. I averaged over 20 points and over 20 rebounds, and I was the only guy in college blocking shots. So after the season was over, they had a Northern California banquet, and they picked another center as Player of the Year in Northern California. Well, that let me know that if I were to accept these as the final judges of my career I would die a bitter old man." He is said to have made a conscious decision to put the team first and foremost, and not worry about individual achievements.

On the hardwood, Russell's experiences were far more pleasant. He led USF to NCAA championships in 1955 and 1956, including a string of 55 consecutive victories, and an unofficial double triple-double with 26 points, 27 rebounds, 20 blocks, 3 steals, and an assist. He became known for his strong defense and shot-blocking skills, once denying 13 shots in a game. UCLA Bruins coach John Wooden called Russell "the greatest defensive man I've ever seen". While at USF, he and Jones helped pioneer a play that later became known as the alley-oop. During his college career, Russell was the NCAA Tournament Most Outstanding Player in 1955, averaging 20.7 points per game and 20.3 rebounds per game.

Track and field
Besides basketball, Russell represented USF in track and field events. He was a standout in the high jump and according to Track & Field News was ranked the seventh-best high-jumper in the world in 1956, his graduation year, despite not competing in Olympic high-jump competition. That year, Russell won high jump titles at the Central California Amateur Athletic Union (AAU) meet, the Pacific AAU meet, and the West Coast Relays (WCR). Like fellow world-class high-jumpers of that era, Russell did not use the Fosbury Flop technique with which all high jump world records after 1978 have been set. He also competed in the  race, which he could complete in 49.6 seconds.

Professional basketball plans
The Harlem Globetrotters invited Russell to join their exhibition basketball squad. Russell, who was sensitive to any racial prejudice, was enraged by the fact that owner Abe Saperstein would only discuss the matter with Woolpert. While Saperstein spoke to Woolpert in a meeting, Globetrotters assistant coach Harry Hanna tried to entertain Russell with jokes, but he was livid after this snub and declined the offer. He reasoned that if Saperstein was too smart to speak with him, then he was too smart to play for Saperstein. Russell made himself eligible for the 1956 NBA draft.

Professional career

1956 NBA draft
In the draft, Boston Celtics coach Red Auerbach set his sights on Russell, thinking his defensive toughness and rebounding prowess were the missing pieces the Celtics needed. Auerbach's thoughts were unorthodox, as in that period centers and forwards were defined by their offensive output, and their ability to play defense was secondary. Boston's chances of getting Russell seemed slim because they had finished second in the previous season and the worst teams had the highest draft picks, and the Celtics had slipped too low in the draft order to pick Russell. In addition, Auerbach had already used his NBA territorial pick to acquire talented forward Tom Heinsohn. Auerbach knew that the Rochester Royals, who owned the first draft pick, already had a strong rebounder in Maurice Stokes, were looking for an outside shooting guard, and were unwilling to pay Russell the $25,000 signing bonus he requested. Celtics owner Walter A. Brown contacted Rochester owner Les Harrison and received an assurance that the Royals could not afford Russell, and they would draft Sihugo Green. Auerbach later said that Brown offered Harrison guaranteed performances of the Ice Capades if they did not draft Russell; it is difficult to verify or disprove this, but it is clear that the Royals underrated Russell.

The St. Louis Hawks, who owned the second pick, drafted Russell but were vying for Celtics center Ed Macauley, a six-time NBA All-Star who had roots in St. Louis. Auerbach agreed to trade Macauley, who had previously asked to be traded to St. Louis in order to be with his sick son, if the Hawks gave up Russell. The owner of the Hawks called Auerbach later and demanded more in the trade. In addition to Macauley, who was the Celtics' premier player at the time, he wanted Cliff Hagan, who had been serving in the military for three years and had not yet played for the Celtics. After much debate, Auerbach agreed to give up Hagan and the Hawks made the trade. During that same draft, Boston also drafted guard K. C. Jones, Russell's former USF teammate, and managed to draft three future Basketball Hall of Famers: Russell, Jones, and Heinsohn. The Russell draft-day trade was later called one of the most important trades in the history of North American sports.

1956 Summer Olympics
Before his NBA rookie year, Russell was the captain of the 1956 U.S. men's Olympic basketball team that competed at the 1956 Summer Olympics, which was held in November and December in Melbourne, Australia, in the Southern Hemisphere. Avery Brundage, head of the International Olympic Committee, argued that Russell had already signed a professional sport contract and was no longer an amateur sportsman, but Russell prevailed. He had the option to skip the tournament and play a full season for the Celtics, but he was determined to play in the Olympics. He later commented that he would have participated in the high jump if he had been snubbed by the basketball team.

Under head coach Gerald Tucker, Russell helped the U.S. national basketball team win the gold medal in Melbourne, defeating the Soviet Union national basketball team 89–55 in the final game with an 8–0 undefeated run. The U.S. dominated the tournament, winning by an average of 53.5 points per game. Russell led the team in scoring, averaging 14.1 points per game for the competition. His former USF and future Celtics teammate K. C. Jones joined him on the Olympic squad and contributed 10.9 points per game, including a Russell–Jones combined 29 points in the finals.

Boston Celtics (1956–1969)

1956–1958: Rookie champion and early years

Due to his Olympic commitment, Russell could not join the Celtics for the 1956–57 NBA season until December. Russell played 48 games, averaging 14.7 points per game and a league-high 19.6 rebounds per game. The 1956–57 Boston Celtics season saw the debut of a starting lineup made up of five future Hall-of-Famers: center Russell, forwards Heinsohn and Frank Ramsey, and guards Bill Sharman and Bob Cousy. K. C. Jones did not play for the Celtics until 1958 because of military service. Russell's first Celtics game came on December 22, 1956, against the St. Louis Hawks, led by star forward Bob Pettit, who would go on to hold several all-time scoring records. Auerbach assigned him to shut down the Hawks' main scorer and Russell impressed the Boston crowd with his man-to-man defense and shot-blocking. In previous years, the Celtics had been a high-scoring team but lacked the defensive presence needed to close out tight games. With the added defensive presence of Russell, the Celtics had laid the foundation for a dynasty, as the team utilized a strong defensive approach to the game, forcing opposing teams to commit many turnovers, which led to many easy points on fast breaks.

Russell was an elite help defender who allowed the Celtics to play the "Hey, Bill" defense: whenever a Celtic requested additional defensive help, he would shout "Hey, Bill!" Russell was so quick that he could run over for a quick double team and make it back in time if the opponents tried to find the open man.  He also became famous for his shot-blocking skills and pundits called his blocks "Wilsonburgers", referring to the Wilson NBA basketballs he "shoved back into the faces of opposing shooters". This skill allowed the other Celtics to play their men aggressively; if they were beaten, they knew that Russell was guarding the basket. Russell's defense was called into question by Eddie Gottlieb, coach of the Philadelphia Warriors, after the Warriors–Celtics game on January 1, 1957, in which he recorded 17 points and 25 rebounds, plus an assist. Gottlieb protested the next day, saying that Russell played a one-man zone and goaltended numerous times, to only be called once. Gottlieb stated: "Our Paul Arizin went underneath for a simple backboard lay-up, and as the ball traveled down towards the basket, Russell batted it away. If that isn't goaltending, I want somebody to tell me what it is. I'm certainly going to ask Maurice Podoloff." Auerbach replied that Gottlieb's statements were "absolutely ridiculous" and said any controversy was "a question of sour grapes".

At that time, Russell received much negative publicity as a player. He was notorious for his public surliness and judgmental attitude towards others. Because Russell ignored virtually any well-wisher who approached him home or away, including the vast majority of media, his autograph was among the most difficult to secure of any professional athlete of his time. Constantly provoked by New York Knicks center Ray Felix during a game, he complained to coach Auerbach, who told him to take matters into his own hands. After the next provocation, Russell pounded Felix to the point of unconsciousness, paid a modest $25 fine, and rarely was the target of cheap fouls thereafter. Russell had a more cordial relationship with many of his teammates with the notable exception of Heinsohn, his old rival and fellow rookie. Heinsohn felt that Russell resented him because the former was named the 1957 NBA Rookie of the Year. Many people thought that Russell was more important even though he had only played half the season. Russell also ignored Heinsohn's request for an autograph on behalf of his cousin and openly said to Heinsohn that he deserved half of his $300 Rookie of the Year check. The relationship between the two was tenuous at best. Despite their different ethnic backgrounds and lack of common off-court interests, his relationship with Cousy was amicable.

The Celtics finished the 1956–57 regular season with a 44–28 record, the team's second-best record since beginning play in the 1946–47 BAA season, which guaranteed Russell his first NBA playoffs appearance, where the Celtics met with the Syracuse Nationals, a team led by Dolph Schayes, through the Eastern Division Finals. In his first playoff game, Russell finished with 16 points and 31 rebounds, along with 7 reported blocks, which were not yet an officially registered statistic. After the Celtics' 108–89 victory, Schayes, who made Johnny Kerr come off the bench because he struggled against Russell in the regular season, quipped: "How much does that guy make a year? It would be to our advantage if we paid him off for five years to get away from us in the rest of this series." The next day, The Boston Globe read: "Russell's Reflexes Befuddles Visitors." 

The Celtics swept the Nationals in three games to earn the franchise's first NBA Finals appearance in the 1957 NBA Finals, where they met the St. Louis Hawks, led by Pettit and former Celtic Ed Macauley. As the teams split the first six games, the tension was so high that in Game 3 Celtics coach Auerbach punched his colleague Ben Kerner and received a $300 fine. In the highly-competitive Game 7, Russell tried his best to slow down Pettit, as Heinsohn scored 37 points and kept the Celtics alive; Russell contributed by completing the famous "Coleman Play", as he ran down Hawks forward Jack Coleman, who had received an outlet pass at midcourt, and blocked his shot despite the fact that Russell had been standing at his own baseline when the ball was thrown to Coleman. The block preserved Boston's slim 103–102 lead with 40-odd seconds left to play in regulation, saving the game for the Celtics. In the second overtime, both teams were in serious foul trouble: Heinsohn had fouled out, and the Hawks were so depleted that they had only seven players left. With the Celtics leading 125–123 with one second left, the Hawks had the ball at their own baseline. Reserve forward Alex Hannum threw a long alley-oop pass to Pettit and Pettit's tip-in rolled indecisively on the rim for several seconds before rolling out again. The Celtics won, earning their first NBA championship.

At the start of the 1957–58 NBA season, the Celtics won fourteen straight games and continued to succeed. Russell averaged 16.6 points per game and a league-record average of 22.7 rebounds per game. The NBA reasoned that other centers were better all-round players than Russell but no player was more valuable to his team. He was voted the NBA Most Valuable Player but only named to the All-NBA Second Team, something that would occur repeatedly throughout his career, as players voted for the MVP award, something that would last until the 1979–80 NBA season, while the media has always voted for the All-NBA teams.

The Celtics won 49 games and made the first berth in the 1958 NBA playoffs, where they met in the 1958 NBA Finals with their familiar rivals, the St. Louis Hawks. The teams split the first two games, but Russell went down with a foot injury in Game 3 and only returned for Game 6. The Celtics won Game 4 in an upset, but the Hawks prevailed in Games 5 and 6, with Pettit scoring 50 points in the deciding Game 6. Many observers thought that Boston could have won had Russell not been injured, but Auerbach commented: "You can always look for excuses ... We just got beat."

1958–1966: Eight straight NBA championships
In the 1958–59 NBA season, Russell averaged 16.7 points per game and 23.0 rebounds per game. The Celtics broke a league record by winning 52 games and Russell's strong performance once again helped lead the Celtics through the 1959 NBA playoffs, as they returned to the NBA Finals. In the 1959 NBA Finals, the Celtics recaptured the NBA title, sweeping the Minneapolis Lakers 4–0. Lakers head coach John Kundla praised Russell, stating: "We don't fear the Celtics without Bill Russell. Take him out and we can beat them ... He's the guy who whipped us psychologically."

In the 1959–60 NBA season, the NBA witnessed the debut of  Philadelphia Warriors center Wilt Chamberlain, who averaged a record 37.6 points per game in his rookie year. On November 7, 1959, Russell's Celtics hosted Chamberlain's Warriors and pundits called the matchup between the best offensive and defensive centers "The Big Collision" and "Battle of the Titans". Both men awed onlookers with "nakedly awesome athleticism", and while Chamberlain outscored Russell 30 to 22, the Celtics won 115–106, and the match was called a "new beginning of basketball". The matchup between Russell and Chamberlain became one of basketball's greatest rivalries.

On February 5, 1960, Russell had 23 points, 51 rebounds, and 5 assists in a 124–100 win over the Syracuse Nationals. It was the record for most rebounds in a single game until November 24, 1960, when Chamberlain grabbed 55 rebounds against Russell, who led the Celtics to a 132–129 win over the Philadelphia Warriors with 18 points, 19 rebounds, and 5 assists. Boston won a then-record 59 regular-season games, including a then-record tying 17-game win streak. In the 1960 NBA playoffs, Russell's Celtics met Chamberlain's Warriors in the Eastern Division Finals. Chamberlain outscored Russell by 81 points in the series, but the Celtics walked off with a 4–2 series win. In the 1960 NBA Finals, the Celtics outlasted the Hawks 4–3 in the series and won their third championship in four years. Russell scored 21 points and grabbed an NBA Finals-record 40 rebounds, plus an assist, in a Game 2 loss, and he added 22 points and 35 rebounds, along with 4 assists, in the deciding Game 7, a 122–103 victory for Boston.

In the 1960–61 NBA season, Russell averaged 16.9 points and 23.9 rebounds per game, leading his team to a regular season mark of 57–22. In the 1961 NBA playoffs, the Celtics defeated the Syracuse Nationals 4–1 in the Eastern Division Finals. The Celtics made good use of the fact that the Los Angeles Lakers had exhausted the St. Louis Hawks in a long seven-game Western Conference Finals, and Boston won the 1961 NBA Finals in five games.

In the 1961–62 NBA season, Russell scored a career-high 18.9 points per game, accompanied by 23.6 rebounds per game. While his rival had a record-breaking season of 50.4 points per game, including Chamberlain's 100-point game, the Celtics became the first team to win 60 games in a season and Russell was voted as the league's MVP. Both Cousy and Russell called it the greatest Celtics team of all-time. In the Eastern Division championships of the 1962 NBA playoffs, the Celtics met the Philadelphia Warriors led by Chamberlain, who averaged 50 points per game that season, and Russell did his best to slow him down. In the pivotal Game 7, Russell managed to hold Chamberlain to 22 points, 28 points below his season average, while scoring 19 points. The game was tied with two seconds left when Sam Jones sank a clutch shot that won the Celtics the series. 

In the 1962 NBA Finals, the Celtics met the Los Angeles Lakers of forward Elgin Baylor and guard Jerry West. The teams split the first six games. In Game 6, Russell recorded his first career triple-double with 19 points, 24 rebounds, and 10 assists as the Celtics won 119–105. At that time, he became the fourth player in Celtics history to have a triple-double, joining Macauley, Cousy, and K. C. Jones. Game 7 was tied one second before the end of regular time, when Lakers guard Rod Hundley faked a shot and passed out to Frank Selvy, who missed an open eight-foot last-second shot that would have won Los Angeles the title. As the game was tied, Russell had the daunting task of defending against Baylor with little frontline help: Loscutoff, Heinsohn, and Satch Sanders, the three best Celtics forwards, had fouled out. In overtime, Frank Ramsey, the fourth forward, fouled out trying to guard Baylor, so Russell was robbed of his usual four-men wing rotation; he and little-used fifth forward Gene Guarilia successfully pressured Baylor into missed shots. Russell finished with a clutch performance, scoring 30 points, along with 4 assists, and tying his own NBA Finals record with 40 rebounds in a 110–107 overtime win.

The Celtics lost Cousy to retirement after the 1962–63 NBA season, and they drafted John Havlicek and were powered by Russell, who averaged 16.8 points and 23.6 rebounds per game, won his fourth regular-season MVP award, and earned the NBA All-Star Game MVP honors at the 1963 NBA All-Star Game following his 19-point, 24-rebound performance for the Eastern Conference's All-Star team. Before the January 31, 1963, 18-point, 22-rebound performance in a 128–125 win against the Cincinnati Royals at Cole Field House in College Park, Maryland, the Celtics were to tour the White House and Russell had a "Do not disturb" sign on his phone. Auerbach had informed his players to not endorse candidates or causes, as it would alienate fans; Cousy campaigned for Ted Kennedy in 1962. President John F. Kennedy posed for a picture with Auerbach and the nine Celtics but not Russell, who overslept because he thought it was just a tour of the White House and did not know President Kennedy would be meeting them. On February 10, 1963, Russell recorded his first regular season triple-double after putting up 17 points, 19 rebounds, and 10 assists in a 129–123 win over the New York Knicks. The Celtics reached the 1963 NBA Finals, where they again defeated the Los Angeles Lakers, this time in six games. In Game 3, Russell had 21 points, 38 rebounds, and 6 assists.

In the 1963–64 NBA season, the Celtics posted a league-best 58–22 record in the regular season. Russell scored 15.0 points per game and grabbed a career-high 24.7 rebounds per game, leading the NBA in rebounds for the first time since Chamberlain entered the league. Boston defeated the Cincinnati Royals 4–1 to earn another NBA Finals appearance and then won against Chamberlain's newly relocated San Francisco Warriors 4–1. It was their sixth consecutive and seventh title in Russell's eight years with the team, a streak unreached in any U.S. professional sports league. Russell later called it the best team of his era and the best defense of all time.

In the 1964–65 NBA season, the Celtics won a league-record 62 games and Russell averaged 14.1 points and 24.1 rebounds per game, winning his second consecutive rebounding title and his fifth MVP award. On March 11, 1965, in a 112–100 win over the Detroit Pistons, Russell grabbed 49 rebounds, which tied for the third-most in a single game in NBA history, along with 27 points and 6 assists. 

In the 1965 NBA playoffs, the Celtics played the Eastern Division Finals against the Philadelphia 76ers, a team that had traded for Chamberlain. Russell held Chamberlain to a pair of field goals in the first three quarters of Game 3. In Game 5, Russell contributed with 12 points, 28 rebounds, and 7 assists, plus 10 blocks and 6 steals; blocks and steals became officially recorded statistics in the 1973–74 NBA season. Schayes, who had become the 76ers coach, said: "The Celtics can thank the Good Lord for Bill Russell." That playoff series ended in a dramatic Game 7, when the Sixers were trailing 110–109 five seconds before the end, but Russell turned over the ball. When the Sixers' Hall-of-Fame guard Hal Greer inbounded, Havlicek stole the ball, causing Celtics commentator Johnny Most to scream: "Havlicek stole the ball! It's all over! Johnny Havlicek stole the ball!" After the Division Finals, the Celtics had an easier time in the NBA Finals, winning 4–1 against the Los Angeles Lakers.

In the 1965–66 NBA season, Russell contributed 12.9 points and 22.8 rebounds per game. This was the first time in seven years that he failed to average at least 23 rebounds a game. The Celtics won the 1966 NBA Finals and their eighth consecutive title. Russell's team again beat Chamberlain's Philadelphia 76ers 4–1 in the Eastern Division Finals, proceeding to win the NBA Finals in a tight showdown against the Los Angeles Lakers, with Russell scoring 25 points and grabbing 32 rebounds, plus giving out an assist, in a 95–93 win in Game 7.

1966–1969: Player-coach champion and final years

Celtics coach Red Auerbach retired before the 1966–67 NBA season. To coach the Celtics, he had initially wanted his old player Frank Ramsey, who was too occupied running his three lucrative nursing homes. His second choice was Cousy, who declined the invitation, stating that he did not want to coach his former teammates. Third choice Tom Heinsohn also said no because he did not think he could handle the often surly Russell, whom he proposed as a player-coach. On April 16, 1966, Russell agreed to become head coach of the Celtics, and a public announcement was made two days later. Russell became the first black head coach in NBA history, and he commented to journalists: "I wasn't offered the job because I am a Negro, I was offered it because Red figured I could do it."

Boston's championship streak ended at eight in his first full season as head coach when Chamberlain's Philadelphia 76ers won a record-breaking 68 regular-season games and were the favorites heading into the 1967 NBA playoffs, where they beat the Celtics 4–1 in the Eastern Division Finals. During the series, Russell said: "Right now, he (Wilt) is playing like me [to win]." The Sixers outpaced the Celtics when they shredded the famed Boston defense by scoring 140 points in the clinching Game 5 win. Russell acknowledged the first real loss of his career, as he had been injured when the Celtics lost the 1958 NBA Finals, by visiting Chamberlain in the locker room, shaking his hand, and saying: "Great."  The game still ended on a high note for Russell. After the loss, he led his grandfather through the Celtics locker rooms and the two saw the white Celtic Havlicek taking a shower next to his black teammate Sam Jones and discussing the game. Suddenly, his grandfather broke down crying. Asked by Russell what was wrong, his grandfather replied how proud he was of him, being coach of an organization in which blacks and whites coexisted in harmony.

In the 1967–68 NBA season, the 34-year-old Russell averaged 12.5 points per game and 18.6 rebounds per game, the latter of which was good enough for the third-highest average in the league. In the Eastern Division Finals of the 1968 NBA playoffs, the Philadelphia 76ers had the better record than Boston and were the favorites. National tragedy struck on April 4, day of the assassination of Martin Luther King Jr. With eight of the ten starting players on Sixers and Celtics being black, both teams were in deep shock and there were calls to cancel the series. In a game called as "unreal" and "devoid of emotion", the Sixers lost 127–118 on April 5. In Game 2, Philadelphia evened the series with a 115–106 win and then went on to win Games 3 and 4. As Chamberlain was often defended by Celtics backup center Wayne Embry, the press speculated that Russell was worn down. Prior to Game 5, no NBA team had ever come back from a 3–1 deficit. The Celtics rallied back, winning Game 5 122–104 and Game 6 114–106, powered by a spirited Havlicek and helped by a terrible Sixers shooting slump.

In Game 7, 15,202 Philadelphia fans witnessed a home-team 100–96 defeat, making it the first time in NBA history a team lost a series after leading 3–1. Russell limited Chamberlain to only two shot attempts in the second half. Despite this, the Celtics were leading only 97–95 with 34 seconds left when Russell closed out the game with several consecutive clutch plays. He made a free throw, blocked a shot by Sixers player Chet Walker, grabbed a rebound off a miss by Greer, and passed the ball to teammate Sam Jones, who scored to clinch the win.  Boston then beat the Los Angeles Lakers 4–2 in the 1968 NBA Finals, giving Russell his tenth title in twelve years. For his efforts, Russell was named Sports Illustrateds Sportsman of the Year. After losing for the fifth straight time against Russell and the Celtics, Hall-of-Fame Lakers guard Jerry West stated: "If I had a choice of any basketball player in the league, my No. 1 choice has to be Bill Russell. Bill Russell never ceases to amaze me."

Duiring the 1968–69 NBA season, Russell was shocked by the assassination of Robert F. Kennedy, disillusioned by the Vietnam War, and weary from his increasingly stale marriage to his wife Rose; the couple later divorced. He was convinced that the U.S. was a corrupt nation and that he was wasting his time playing something as superficial as basketball. He was 15 pounds overweight, skipped mandatory NBA coach meetings, and was generally lacking energy; after a New York Knicks game, he complained of intense pain and was diagnosed with acute exhaustion. Russell pulled himself together and put up 9.9 points and 19.3 rebounds per game; the aging Celtics stumbled through the regular season. Their 48–34 record was the team's worst since the 1955–56 NBA season and they entered the 1969 NBA playoffs as the fourth-seeded team in the East. 

Russell and the Celtics achieved upsets over the 76ers and the Knicks to earn a meeting with the Los Angeles Lakers in the 1969 NBA Finals. The Lakers featured new recruit Chamberlain next to perennial stars Baylor and West, and were the favorites. In the first two games, Russell ordered his players not to double-team West, who used the freedom to score 53 and 41 points in the Game 1 and 2 Laker wins. Russell then reversed himself and ordered his team to double-team West and Boston won Game 3. In Game 4, the Celtics were trailing by one point with seven seconds left and the Lakers had the ball until Baylor stepped out of bounds. In the last play, Sam Jones used a triple screen by Bailey Howell, Larry Siegfried, and Havlicek to hit a buzzer beater that equalized the series. The teams split the next two games and it all came down to Game 7 in Los Angeles, where Lakers owner Jack Kent Cooke angered and motivated the Celtics by putting "proceedings of Lakers victory ceremony" on the game leaflets. Russell used a copy as extra motivation and told his team to play a running game because in that case it was not the better but the more determined team that was going to win.

The Celtics were ahead by nine points with five minutes remaining; in addition, West was limping after a Game 5 thigh injury and Chamberlain had left the game with an injured leg. West then hit one basket after the other and cut the lead to one, and Chamberlain asked to return to the game. Lakers coach Bill van Breda Kolff kept him on the bench until the end of the game, saying later that he wanted to stay with the lineup responsible for the comeback. The Celtics held on for a 108–106 victory and Russell claimed his eleventh championship in thirteen years. At age 35, Russell contributed with 6 points, 21 rebounds, and 6 assists in his last NBA game. After the game, Russell went over to the distraught West, who had scored 42 points and was named the only NBA Finals MVP in history from the losing team, clasped his hand and tried to soothe him. 

Days later, 30,000 Celtics fans cheered their returning heroes. Russell, who once said he owed the public nothing, was not there; he ended his career and cut all ties to the Celtics. It was so surprising that Auerbach was blindsided and made the mistake of drafting guard Jo Jo White instead of a center. Although White became a standout Celtics player, Boston lacked an All-Star center, went 34–48 in the 1969–70 NBA season, and failed to make it to the 1970 NBA playoffs, marking the first time since 1950 that they did not make the playoffs. In Boston, both fans and journalists felt betrayed because Russell left the Celtics without a coach and a center, and he sold his retirement story for $10,000 to Sports Illustrated. Russell was accused of selling out the future of the franchise for a month of his salary. Russell notified Auerbach that he was resigning to join a career in television and movies "in order to find new sources of income for the future".

Post-playing career

In 1971, Russell joined NBA on ABC to do commentary on the Game of the Week. His No. 6 jersey was retired by the Celtics on March 12, 1972, Russell had worn the same number 6 at the USF and for the 1956 U.S. Olympic team. He was inducted into the Naismith Memorial Basketball Hall of Fame in 1975. Russell, who had a difficult relationship with the media, did not attend either ceremony. He attended his 2021 induction into the Basketball Hall of Fame as a coach.

After retiring as a player, Russell had stints as head coach of the Seattle SuperSonics (1973–1977) and Sacramento Kings (1987–1988). His time as a non-player coach was lackluster; he led the struggling SuperSonics into the playoffs for the first time in franchise history, but Russell's defensive, team-oriented Celtics mindset did not mesh well with the team, and he left in 1977 with a 162–166 record. Russell's stint with the Kings was considerably shorter, his last assignment ending when the Kings went 17–41 to begin the 1987–88 NBA season. He finished with a 341–290 regular season record and was 34–27 in the playoffs. Russell also served as general manager of the SuperSonics during his coaching tenure, and held the same position with the Kings during the 1988–89 season. In addition, Russell ran into financial trouble. He had invested $250,000 in a rubber plantation in Liberia, where he had wanted to spend his retirement, but it went bankrupt. The same fate awaited his Boston restaurant Slade's, after which he had to default on a $90,000 government loan to purchase the outlet. The Internal Revenue Service discovered that Russell owed $34,430 in tax money and put a lien on his house.

Russell became a vegetarian, took up golf, and worked as a color commentator for CBS and TBS throughout the 1970s into the mid-1980s, but he was uncomfortable as a broadcaster. He later said: "The most successful television is done in eight-second thoughts, and the things I know about basketball, motivation, and people go deeper than that." On November 3, 1979, Russell hosted Saturday Night Live, in which he appeared in several sports-related sketches. Russell also wrote books, usually written as a joint project with a professional writer, including 1979's Second Wind, and played Judge Roger Ferguson in the Miami Vice episode "The Fix" (aired March 7, 1986). In 1985, former Celtic teammate Don Chaney, who was head coach of the Los Angeles Clippers, asked Russell to tutor Benoit Benjamin, the third overall draft pick from Creighton University, who left after his junior season; according to Chaney, Russell did not get paid for it.

Russell made few public appearances in the early 1990s, living as a near-recluse on Mercer Island, Washington, near Seattle. Following Chamberlain's death in October 1999, Russell returned to prominence at the turn of the millennium. Russell's Rules was published in 2001, and he convinced Miami Heat superstar center Shaquille O'Neal to bury the hatchet with fellow NBA superstar and former Los Angeles Lakers teammate Kobe Bryant and end the Shaq–Kobe feud in January 2006. On November 17, the two-time NCAA champion Russell was recognized for his impact on college basketball as a member of the founding class of the National Collegiate Basketball Hall of Fame. He was one of five, along with James Naismith, Oscar Robertson, Dean Smith, and John Wooden, selected to represent the inaugural class. On May 20, 2007, Russell was awarded an honorary doctorate by Suffolk University, where he served as its commencement speaker. Russell also received honorary degrees from Harvard University on June 7, 2007, and from Dartmouth College on June 14, 2009. On June 18, 2007, Russell was inducted as a member of the founding class of the FIBA Hall of Fame. In 2008, Russell received the Golden Plate Award of the Academy of Achievement.

On February 14, 2009, NBA Commissioner David Stern announced that the NBA Finals Most Valuable Player Award would be renamed the Bill Russell NBA Finals Most Valuable Player Award in his honor as an 11-time NBA champion. During halftime of the 2009 NBA All-Star Game, Celtics captains Ray Allen, Kevin Garnett, and Paul Pierce presented Russell a surprise birthday cake for his 75th birthday. Russell attended Game 5 of the 2009 NBA Finals to present Bryant the NBA Finals Most Valuable Player award. Russell was awarded the Presidential Medal of Freedom by President Barack Obama in 2011. Russell and Bryant were spectators to a basketball game for Obama's 50th birthday at the White House tennis court. The game featured Shane Battier, LeBron James, Magic Johnson, Maya Moore, Alonzo Mourning, Joakim Noah, Chris Paul, Derrick Rose, and Obama's friends from high school.

Accomplishments and legacy

Russell is one of the most successful and decorated athletes in North American sports history. His awards and achievements include eleven NBA championships with the Boston Celtics in thirteen seasons, two of which were won as player-coach, and he is credited with having raised defensive play in the NBA to a new level. By winning the 1956 NCAA championship with USF and the 1957 NBA title with the Celtics, Russell became the first of only four players in basketball history to win an NCAA championship and an NBA championship back-to-back, the others being Henry Bibby, Magic Johnson, and Billy Thompson. He also won two state championships in high school. In the interim, Russell won an Olympic gold medal in 1956. His stint as coach of the Celtics was also of historical significance, as he became the first black head coach in the NBA, when he succeeded Red Auerbach.

In his first NBA full season (1957–58), Russell became the first player in NBA history to average more than 20 rebounds per game for an entire season, a feat he accomplished ten times in his thirteen seasons. Russell's 51 rebounds in a single game is the second-highest performance ever, trailing only Wilt Chamberlain's all-time record of 55. He still holds the NBA record for rebounds in one half with 32 (vs. Philadelphia, November 16, 1957). Career-wise in rebounds, Russell ranks second to Chamberlain in regular season total (21,620) and average per game (22.5), and he led the NBA in average rebounds per game four times. Russell is the all-time playoff leader in total (4,104) and average (24.9) rebounds per game, he grabbed 40 rebounds in three separate playoff games (twice in the NBA Finals), and he never failed to average at least 20 rebounds per game in any of his thirteen playoff campaigns. Russell also had seven regular-season games with 40 or more rebounds, the NBA Finals record for highest rebound per game average (29.5, 1959) and by a rookie (22.9, 1957). In addition, Russell holds the NBA Finals single-game record for most rebounds (40, March 29, 1960, vs. St. Louis, and April 18, 1962, vs. Los Angeles), most rebounds in a quarter (19, April 18, 1962, vs. Los Angeles), and most consecutive games with 20 or more rebounds (15 from April 9, 1960 – April 16, 1963). He also had 51 in one game, 49 in two others, and twelve straight seasons of 1,000 or more rebounds. Russell was known as one of the most clutch players in the NBA. He played in eleven deciding games (ten times in Game 7s, once in a Game 5) and ended with a 11–0 record. In these eleven games, Russell averaged 18.3 points and 29.4 rebounds.

Russell was considered the consummate defensive center, noted for his defensive intensity, basketball IQ, and will to win. He excelled at playing man-to-man defense, blocking shots, and grabbing defensive rebounds. Chamberlain said Russell's timing as a shot-blocker was unparalleled. In 2009, Russell's erstwhile Knicks opponent Bill Bradley wrote in The New York Times Book Review that Russell "was the smartest player ever to play the game [of basketball]". He could score with putbacks and made mid-air outlet passes to point guard Bob Cousy for easy fast-break points. He was also known as a fine passer and pick-and-roll setter, featured a decent left-handed hook shot, and finished strong on alley oops. On offense, Russell's output was limited and his NBA career personal averages show him to be an average scorer (15.1 points career average), a poor free-throw shooter (56.1%), and average overall shooter from the field (44%, not exceptional for a center). In his thirteen years, he averaged a relatively low 13.4 field goals attempted (normally, top scorers average 20 and more), illustrating that he was never the focal point of the Celtics offense, who instead focused on his elite defense. He ranks No. 1 in NBA history for defensive win shares at 133.6, with Tim Duncan in second at 106.3. While blocked shots were not a recorded basketball statistic during Russell's career, he averaged 8.1 blocks in 135 games, as Boston writers often attempted to tally his blocks. Bill Simmons has estimated that Russell had between 8 and 15 blocks per game in the playoffs.

In his career, Russell won five NBA MVP awards (1959, 1961–63, 1965), which is tied with Michael Jordan for second all-time behind Kareem Abdul-Jabbar's six awards, and is at No. 6 for most regular season MVP–NBA Finals MVP awards, despite the latter being assigned only since 1969. He was selected three times to the All-NBA First Teams (1959, 1963, 1965) and eight Second Teams (1958, 1960–62, 1964, 1966–68), and was a 12-time NBA All-Star (1958–1969). Russell was elected to one NBA All-Defensive First Team. This took place during his last season (1969) and was the first season the NBA All-Defensive Teams were selected. In 1970, The Sporting News named Russell the "Athlete of the Decade". Russell is universally seen as one of the best NBA players ever, and he was declared "Greatest Player in the History of the NBA" by the Professional Basketball Writers Association of America in 1980.

For his achievements, Russell was named "Sportsman of the Year" by Sports Illustrated in 1968. He is one of four players (along with Cousy, George Mikan, and Bob Pettit) to have made all four NBA anniversary teams: the NBA 25th Anniversary Team (1970), the NBA 35th Anniversary Team (1980), the NBA 50th Anniversary Team (1996), and the NBA 75th Anniversary Team (2021). Russell ranked No. 18 on ESPN's "50 Greatest Athletes of the 20th Century" list in 1999. In 2007, he was voted the third best center of all-time by ESPN behind Abdul-Jabbar and Chamberlain. In 2009, Slam named him the third best player of all-time behind Jordan and Chamberlain. In 2020, he was ranked No. 4 in ESPN's list of the top 74 NBA players of all time, the second best center behind Abdul-Jabbar and ahead of Chamberlain. In 2022, he was ranked No. 6 in ESPN's NBA 75th Anniversary Team list, and No. 4 in a similar list by The Athletic.

Of Russell, former NBA player and head coach Don Nelson said: "There are two types of superstars. One makes himself look good at the expense of the other guys on the floor. But there's another type who makes the players around him look better than they are, and that's the type Russell was." In 2000, his longtime teammate Tom Heinsohn described both Russell's stature and his uneasy relationship with Boston more earthily, saying: "Look, all I know is the guy ... came to Boston and won 11 championships in 13 years, and they named a bleeping tunnel after Ted Williams." During the NBA All-Star Weekend on February 14, 2009, NBA Commissioner David Stern announced that the NBA Finals MVP award would be named after Russell. He was named as a 2010 recipient of the Presidential Medal of Freedom. On June 15, 2017, Russell was announced as the inaugural recipient of the NBA Lifetime Achievement Award. In October 2021, Russell was honored as one of the league's 75 greatest players of all-time.

On August 11, 2022, it was announced that Russell's No. 6 jersey would be retired throughout the National Basketball Association, the first time a jersey had been retired league-wide in NBA history, and joining Jackie Robinson and Wayne Gretzky in the honor among  the four major American sports leagues. However, the NBA players who currently wore the number 6 jersey (i.e. LeBron James of the Los Angeles Lakers), are grandfathered—they may keep the number until they voluntarily change it or retire—but the number will not be issued again to a new player.

Statue
In 2013, Boston honored Russell by erecting a statue of him on City Hall Plaza. He is depicted in-game, surrounded by 11 plinths representing the 11 championships he helped the Celtics win. Each plinth features a key word and related quote to illustrate Russell's multiple accomplishments. The Bill Russell Legacy Foundation, established by the Boston Celtics Shamrock Foundation, funded the project. The art is by Ann Hirsch of Somerville, Massachusetts, in collaboration with Pressley Associates Landscape Architects of Boston. The statue was unveiled on November 1, 2013, with Russell in attendance. During the spring of 2015, two statues of children were added, honoring Russell's commitment to working with children. These statues were modeled by a local boy from Somerville and multiple girls from the surrounding area.

West Coast Conference's Russell Rule
On August 2, 2020, the West Coast Conference (WCC), which has been home to Russell's alma mater of USF since the league's formation in 1952, became the first NCAA Division I conference to adopt a conference-wide diversity hiring commitment, announcing the Russell Rule, named after Russell and based on the National Football League's Rooney Rule. In its announcement, the WCC stated: "The 'Russell Rule' requires each member institution to include a member of a traditionally underrepresented community in the pool of final candidates for every athletic director, senior administrator, head coach and full-time assistant coach position in the athletic department."

NBA career statistics

Regular season

Playoffs

Source:

Head coaching record

|-
|style="text-align:left;"|Boston
|style="text-align:left;"|
|81||60||21||.671|| style="text-align:center;"|2nd in Eastern||9||4||5||.444
|style="text-align:center;"|Lost in Division Finals
|-! style="background:#FDE910;"
|style="text-align:left;"|Boston
|style="text-align:left;"|
|82||54||28||.659|| style="text-align:center;"|2nd in Eastern||19||12||7||.632
|style="text-align:center;"|Won NBA championship
|-! style="background:#FDE910;"
|style="text-align:left;"|Boston
|style="text-align:left;"|
|82||48||34||.585|| style="text-align:center;"|4th in Eastern||18||12||6||.667
|style="text-align:center;"|Won NBA championship
|-
|style="text-align:left;"|Seattle
|style="text-align:left;"|
|82||36||46||.439|| style="text-align:center;"|3rd in Pacific||—||—||—||—
|style="text-align:center;"|Missed playoffs
|-
|style="text-align:left;"|Seattle
|style="text-align:left;"|
|82||43||39||.524|| style="text-align:center;"|2nd in Pacific||9||4||5||.444
|style="text-align:center;"|Lost in Conference Semifinals
|-
|style="text-align:left;"|Seattle
|style="text-align:left;"|
|82||43||39||.524|| style="text-align:center;"|2nd in Pacific||6||2||4||.333
|style="text-align:center;"|Lost in Conference Semifinals
|-
|style="text-align:left;"|Seattle
|style="text-align:left;"|
|82||40||42||.488|| style="text-align:center;"|4th in Pacific||—||—||—||—
|style="text-align:center;"|Missed playoffs
|-
|style="text-align:left;"|Sacramento
|style="text-align:left;"|
|58||17||41||.293|| style="text-align:center;"|(released)||—||—||—||—
|style="text-align:center;"|—
|-class="sortbottom"
|style="text-align:left;"|Career
|||631||341||290||.540|| ||61||34||27||.557||

Personal life and death

Russell was married to his college sweetheart Rose Swisher from 1956 to 1973. They had three children: daughter Karen Russell, a television pundit and lawyer, and sons William Jr. and Jacob. The couple grew emotionally distant and divorced. In 1977, he married Dorothy Anstett, Miss USA of 1968; they divorced in 1980. In 1996, Russell married his third wife, Marilyn Nault; their marriage lasted until her death in January 2009. Russell was married to Jeannine Russell at the time of his death. He was a resident of Mercer Island, Washington, for over four decades. His older brother was the noted playwright Charlie L. Russell.

In 1959, Russell became the first NBA player to visit Africa. Russell was a member of Kappa Alpha Psi fraternity, having been initiated into its Gamma Alpha chapter while a student at University of San Francisco. On October 16, 2013, Russell was arrested for bringing his registered, loaded .38-caliber Smith & Wesson handgun to the Seattle–Tacoma International Airport. He was issued a citation and released, and the Transportation Security Administration indicated it would levy a civil penalty, which would be between $3,000 and $7,500.

Russell died at his Mercer Island, Washington, home on July 31, 2022, at the age of 88. The news was announced in a Twitter post by his family. In a statement, NBA Commissioner Adam Silver said that Russell was "the greatest champion in all of team sports".

Earnings
During his career, Russell was one of the first big earners in NBA basketball. His 1956 rookie contract was worth $24,000, only fractionally smaller than the $25,000 of top earner and teammate Bob Cousy. Russell never had to work part-time. This was in contrast to other Celtics who had to work during the offseason to maintain their standard of living; Tom Heinsohn sold insurance, Gene Guarilia was a professional guitar player, Cousy ran a basketball camp, and Red Auerbach invested in plastics and a Chinese restaurant. When Wilt Chamberlain became the first NBA player to earn $100,000 in salary in 1965, Russell went to Auerbach and demanded a $100,001 salary, which he promptly received. For his promotion to coach, the Celtics paid Russell an annual salary of $25,000 which was in addition to his salary as a player. Although the salary was touted in the press as a record for an NBA coach, it is unclear whether Russell's continued $100,001 salary as a player was included in the calculation. Russell also had a shoe designed by Bristol Manufacturing Corporation in 1966, the Bill Russell Professional Basketball Shoe.

Personality
In 1966, The New York Times wrote that "Russell's main characteristics are pride, intelligence, an active and appreciative sense of humor, a preoccupation with dignity, a capacity for consideration once his friendship or sympathy has been aroused, and an unwillingness to compromise whatever truths he has accepted." In 2009, Russell wrote his paternal grandfather's motto, passed down to his father and then to him: "A man has to draw a line inside himself that he won't allow any man to cross." Russell said he was "proud of my grandfather's heroic dignity against forces more powerful than him ... he would not allow himself to be oppressed or intimidated by anyone." He wrote these words after recounting how grandfather Jake Russell had stood up to the Ku Klux Klan and other whites who attempted to thwart his efforts to build a schoolhouse for black children; his grandfather was the first person in Russell's patrilineal line born free in North America and was himself illiterate. Russell's motto became: "If you disrespect that line, you disrespect me."

As a competitor
Russell was driven by "a neurotic need to win", as his Celtic teammate Tom Heinsohn observed. He was so tense before every game that he regularly vomited in the locker room; early in his career, it happened so frequently that his fellow Celtics were more worried when it did not happen than when it did. Later in Russell's career, John Havlicek said of his teammate and coach that he threw up less often than early in his career, only doing so "when it's an important game or an important challenge for him—someone like Chamberlain, or someone coming up that everyone's touting. [The sound of Russell throwing up] is a welcome sound, too, because it means he's keyed up for the game, and around the locker room we grin and say, 'Man, we're going to be all right tonight.

In a retrospective interview, Russell described the state of mind he felt he needed to enter in order to be able to play basketball: "I had to almost be in a rage. Nothing went on outside the borders of the court. I could hear anything, I could see anything, and nothing mattered. And I could anticipate every move that every player made." Russell was also known for his natural authority. When he became player-coach in 1966, Russell bluntly said to his teammates that "he intended to cut all personal ties to other players" and seamlessly made the transition from their peer to their superior. At the time his additional role of coach was announced, Russell publicly stated he believed Red Auerbach's impact as a coach confined every or almost every relationship with each Celtic player to a strictly professional one. Russell regarded Auerbach as "the greatest of all coaches".

Off the court
Russell was known for his distinctive high-pitched laugh, of which Auerbach quipped: "There are only two things that could make me quit coaching. My wife and Russell's laugh." To teammates and friends, Russell was open and amicable; he was extremely distrusting and cold towards anyone else. Journalists were often treated to the "Russell Glower", described as an "icily contemptuous stare accompanied by a long silence". Russell was also notorious for his refusal to give autographs or acknowledge the Celtics fans, and was called "the most selfish, surly and uncooperative athlete" by one pundit.

Russell–Chamberlain relations

For most of his career, Russell and his perennial opponent Wilt Chamberlain were close friends. Chamberlain often invited Russell over for Thanksgiving dinner; at Russell's place, conversation mostly concerned Russell's electric trains. The close relationship ended after Game 7 of the 1969 NBA Finals, when Chamberlain injured his knee with six minutes left and was forced to leave the game. During a conversation with students, a reporter—unknown to Russell—heard Russell describe Chamberlain as a malingerer and accused him of "copping out" of the game when it seemed that the Lakers would lose. He was livid with Russell and saw him as a backstabber.

Chamberlain's knee was injured so badly that he could not play the entire offseason and he ruptured it the next season. The two men did not speak to each other for more than twenty years until Russell met with Chamberlain and personally apologized. After that, the two were often seen together at various events and interviewed as friends. When Chamberlain died in 1999, Chamberlain's nephew said that Russell was the second person he was told to call. In delivering a eulogy for Chamberlain, Russell stated that he did not consider them to be rivals, but rather to have a competition, and that the pair would "be friends through eternity".

Chamberlain outscored Russell 30 to 14.2 and outrebounded him 28.2 to 22.9 in the regular season, and he also outscored him 25.7 to 14.9 and outrebounded him 28 to 24.7 in the playoffs. Russell's Celtics went 57–37 in the regular season against Chamberlain's teams and 29–20 in the playoffs, Chamberlain's losing seven of the eight series.

Racist abuse, controversy, and relationship with Boston fans

Russell's life was marked by an uphill battle against racism and controversial actions and statements in response to racism. As a child, he witnessed how his parents were victims of racial abuse, and the family eventually moved into government housing projects to escape the daily torrent of bigotry. When he later became a standout college player at USF, Russell recalled how he and his few fellow black teammates were jeered by white students. Even after he became a star with the Celtics, Russell was the victim of racial abuse. When the NBA All-Stars toured the U.S. in the 1958 offseason, white hotel owners in segregated North Carolina denied rooms to Russell and his black teammates, causing him to later write in his 1966 memoir Go Up for Glory: "It stood out, a wall which understanding cannot penetrate. You are a Negro. You are less. It covered every area. A living, smarting, hurting, smelling, greasy substance which covered you. A morass to fight from." Before the 1961–62 season, Russell's team was scheduled to play in an exhibition game in Lexington, Kentucky, when Russell and his black teammates were refused service at a local restaurant. As part of the 1961 Celtics boycott, he and the other black teammates refused to play in the exhibition game and flew home, drawing a great deal of controversy and publicity.

As a consequence of his endured racist abuse, Russell was extremely sensitive to all racial prejudice. According to Taylor, he often perceived insults even if others did not. He was active in the Black Power movement and was among the African-American athletes and the one political leader who came together at the 1967 Cleveland Summit to support Muhammad Ali and his decision to refuse to be drafted. He was often called Felton X, presumably in the tradition of the Nation of Islam's practice of replacing a European slave name with an X and purchased land in Liberia. Russell's public statements became increasingly militant, and he was quoted as saying: "I dislike most white people because they are people ... I like most blacks because I am black." Russell articulated these views with a measure of self-criticism, saying: "I consider this a deficiency in myself—maybe. If I looked at it objectively, detached myself, it would be a deficiency." When his white Celtics teammate Frank Ramsey asked whether he hated him, Russell stated that he had been misquoted but few believed it. According to Taylor, Russell discounted the fact that his career was facilitated by white people who were proven anti-racists: his high school coach George Powles, who encouraged him to play basketball, his college coach Phil Woolpert, who integrated USF basketball, Celtics coach Red Auerbach, who made him the first black NBA coach and is regarded as an anti-racist pioneer for his no color barrier, and Celtics owner Walter A. Brown, who gave him a high $24,000 rookie contract, just $1,000 shy of the top-earning veteran Bob Cousy.

In a 1963 article by Sports Illustrated, Russell said he had "never met a finer person [than George Powles] ... I owe so much to him it's impossible to express." Years after Taylor's book, Russell published the autobiographical account Red and Me, which chronicled his lifelong friendship with Auerbach. Of the book, Bill Bradley wrote for The New York Times Book Review that "Bill Russell is a private, complex man, but on the subject of his love of Red Auerbach and his Celtic teammates, he's loud and clear." In the book, Russell wrote: "Whenever I leave the Celtics locker room, even Heaven wouldn't be good enough because anywhere else is a step down ... With Red [Auerbach] and Walter Brown, I was the freest athlete on the planet. I could always be myself with them and they were always there for me." Describing the Celtics organization, as distinguished from Boston sports fans in the 1950s and 1960s, as very progressive racially, Russell recalled in 2010 a list of the organization's accomplishments on racial progress both in terms of objective milestones and his own subjective experience as a member of the organization. He said:

 
 
In 1966, Russell was promoted to head coach of the Celtics. During a press conference, Russell was asked: "As the first Negro head coach in a major league sport, can you do the job impartially without any racial prejudice in reverse?" He replied: "Yes." When the reporter asked how, Russell responded: "Because the most important factor is respect. And in basketball I respect a man for his ability, period." As a result of repeated racial bigotry, Russell refused to respond to fan acclaim or friendship from his neighbors, thinking it was insincere and hypocritical. This attitude contributed to his bad rapport with fans and journalists. He alienated Celtics fans by saying: "You owe the public the same it owes you, nothing! I refuse to smile and be nice to the kiddies." This supported the opinion of many white fans that Russell, who was by then the highest-paid Celtic, was egotistical, paranoid, and hypocritical. The already hostile atmosphere between Russell and Boston hit its apex when vandals broke into his house in Reading, Massachusetts, covered the walls with racist graffiti, damaged his trophies, and defecated in the beds. In response, Russell described Boston as a "flea market of racism". He was quoted as saying: "From my very first year I thought of myself as playing for the Celtics, not for Boston. The fans could do or think whatever they wanted." Referring to a time when the Celtics did not frequently sell out the Boston Garden, while the generally mediocre and all-white NHL Boston Bruins did, Russell recalled: "We [the Celtics] did a survey about what we could do to improve attendance. Over 50 percent of responses said 'There's too many black players. In retirement, Russell described the Boston press as corrupt and racist; in response, Boston sports journalist Larry Claflin claimed that Russell himself was the real racist. The FBI maintained a file on Russell and described him in their file as "an arrogant Negro who won't sign autographs for white children".

Russell refused to attend the ceremony when his jersey No. 6 was retired in 1972; he also refused to attend his induction into the Hall of Fame in 1975. While Russell long had sore feelings towards Boston, there was something of a reconciliation, and he visited the city regularly in his later years, something he never did in the years immediately after his retirement. On November 15, 2019, Russell accepted the Hall of Fame ring in a private ceremony with family. When Russell originally retired, he demanded that his jersey be retired in an empty Boston Garden. In 1995, the Celtics left the Boston Garden and entered the FleetCenter, now known as the TD Garden; as the main festive act, the Celtics wanted to re-retire Russell's jersey in front of a sellout audience. Perennially wary of what he long perceived as a racist city, Russell decided to make amends and gave his approval. On May 6, 1999, the Celtics re-retired Russell's jersey in a ceremony attended by his on-court rival and friend Chamberlain, along with Celtics legend Larry Bird and Hall of Famer Kareem Abdul-Jabbar. The crowd gave Russell a prolonged standing ovation, which brought tears to his eyes. He thanked Chamberlain for taking him to the limit and "making [him] a better player", and the crowd for "allowing [him] to be a part of their lives." In December 2008, the We Are Boston Leadership Award was presented to Russell.

On September 26, 2017, Russell posted a photograph of himself to a previously unused Twitter account in which he was taking the knee in solidarity with the U.S. national anthem kneeling protests. Russell wore his Presidential Medal of Freedom and the image was captioned: "Proud to take a knee, and to stand tall against social injustice." In an interview with ESPN, Russell said he wanted the NFL players to know they were not alone.

See also
 List of National Basketball Association annual minutes leaders
 List of National Basketball Association annual rebounding leaders
 List of National Basketball Association career minutes played leaders
 List of National Basketball Association career playoff rebounding leaders
 List of National Basketball Association career rebounding leaders
 List of National Basketball Association longest winning streaks
 List of National Basketball Association single-game rebounding leaders
 List of National Basketball Association rookie single-season rebounding leaders
 List of National Basketball Association single-season rebounding leaders
 List of NBA players with most championships
 List of NCAA Division I men's basketball career rebounding leaders
 Race and ethnicity in the NBA

Selected publications

Footnotes

References

Further reading

External links

 
 FIBA Hall of Fame on Russell
 
 

1934 births
2022 deaths
African-American basketball coaches
African-American basketball players
African-American male track and field athletes
African-American sports executives and administrators
All-American college men's basketball players
American men's basketball coaches
American men's basketball players
American sports executives and administrators
Basketball coaches from California
Basketball coaches from Louisiana
Basketball players at the 1956 Summer Olympics
Basketball players from Boston
Basketball players from Louisiana
Basketball players from Oakland, California
Boston Celtics head coaches
Boston Celtics players
Centers (basketball)
FIBA Hall of Fame inductees
Medalists at the 1956 Summer Olympics
Naismith Memorial Basketball Hall of Fame inductees
National Basketball Association All-Stars
National Basketball Association broadcasters
National Basketball Association championship-winning head coaches
National Basketball Association players with retired numbers
Olympic gold medalists for the United States in basketball
People from West Monroe, Louisiana
Player-coaches
Presidential Medal of Freedom recipients
Sacramento Kings head coaches
San Francisco Dons men's basketball players
San Francisco Dons men's track and field athletes
Seattle SuperSonics general managers
Seattle SuperSonics head coaches
Sportspeople from Monroe, Louisiana
St. Louis Hawks draft picks
Track and field athletes from Louisiana
Track and field athletes from Oakland, California
United States men's national basketball team players